Stuart L. Sternberg (born August 8, 1959) is an American Wall Street investor. He is the principal shareholder of the ownership group that owns the Tampa Bay Rays and acts as the team's Managing General Partner since November 2005.

Early life
The youngest of three children, Sternberg was born on August 8, 1959, and raised in a Jewish family on Avenue M in the Canarsie neighborhood of New York's Brooklyn borough He is the son of Beverly (née Tartell) and Samuel Sternberg and his parents owned a pillow shop on Flatbush Avenue. His passion for baseball developed in his childhood while playing the game in the streets and playgrounds of his neighborhood. One of Sternberg's most cherished memories is when he saw Sandy Koufax pitch while attending his first Major League game with his father at Shea Stadium in 1965. Sternberg has played in various organized baseball leagues over his lifetime and coached his two sons' Little League teams for five years. He attended yeshiva through third grade, wearing a kippah every day and went to Canarsie High School.

Career in the financial services industry
In 1978, Sternberg began his professional career trading equity options part-time at the American Stock Exchange while attending St. John's University earning a degree in finance. After college Sternberg was hired by investment group Spear, Leeds & Kellogg, and he eventually became a partner in the firm before he moved to Goldman Sachs. In 2002 he retired from the company as a partner. He has served on several committees and advisory boards in the financial securities industry.

Major League Baseball

Purchasing the Tampa Bay Devil Rays
Sternberg purchased a 48% plurality-share in the previously named Devil Rays (now known as the Tampa Bay Rays) in May 2004 from Vince Naimoli and took over operations becoming a managing general partner in October 2005. He structured his bid for controlling interest in the team with fellow Goldman Sachs partner Matthew Silverman whom he hired as the team's president.

Interest in Buying the New York Mets
In February 2011, an article in Business Insider speculated that Sternberg would be a potential owner of the New York Mets. Two major factors that supported the theory is that Sternberg is a Mets season ticket holder and that Sternberg had expressed negative feelings about the Rays due to low fan attendance. However this was proven wrong in a recent interview. He said he was happy with the Rays and has no interest in buying another team. Many Tampa Bay Rays fans said they had hoped he would sell the Rays and buy the Mets citing the owner's lack of commitment to the area and the on-field product.

Frustration with the Rays in St. Petersburg
In a June 2011 Tampa Tribune interview he said, "I know we can't sustain ourselves like this. It hasn't gotten better. If anything, it's worse. To run a payroll like we do now, basically the second-lowest in baseball, and barely keep our nose above water, we can't sustain that. Baseball is just not going to stand for it anymore. And they'll find a place for me. They won't find a place here though." He reiterated his stance and raised the specter of relocation after the Rays were eliminated from the playoffs that season. However he has stated several times that he is staying with the team and they are not moving anywhere within the coming years.

In October 2014, it was reported that Sternberg frustrated with efforts to build a new stadium in the Tampa Bay area, had discussions with Wall Street associates about moving the Rays to Montreal, which has not had an MLB franchise since the Montreal Expos moved to Washington, D.C. in 2005 to become the Washington Nationals.

Personal life
Sternberg currently resides in Rye, New York with his wife, Lisa, and four children, Sanford, Jake, Natalie, and Ella.

References

Sources
Front Office Directory
Team's new boss: 'Baseball junkie' with business savvy
An Open Letter to Stuart Sternberg from BaseLine Report: Why There is Hope for the Rays

Further reading
 This chapter in Ruttman's oral history, based on an April 20, 2009 interview with Sternberg conducted for the book, discusses Sternberg's American, Jewish, baseball, and life experiences from youth to the present.

American sports businesspeople
Tampa Bay Rays owners
Major League Baseball owners
United Football League (2009–2012) owners
Jewish American baseball people
American financial businesspeople
1959 births
Living people
Florida Tuskers
People from Canarsie, Brooklyn
St. John's University (New York City) alumni
Canarsie High School alumni
Tampa Bay Rowdies executives
Jewish American sportspeople
21st-century American Jews